The Falkbeer Countergambit is a chess opening that begins:
1. e4 e5
2. f4 d5

After the standard capture, 3.exd5, Black may reply with 3...exf4, transposing into the King's Gambit Accepted, 3...e4, or the more modern 3...c6.

A well-known blunder in this opening is White's reply 3.fxe5, which after 3...Qh4+, either loses  after 4.g3 Qxe4+, forking the king and rook, or severely exposes the white king to the black pieces after 4.Ke2 Qxe4+ 5.Kf2 Bc5+. 

The opening bears the name of Austrian master Ernst Falkbeer who played it in an 1851 game against Adolf Anderssen. The Encyclopaedia of Chess Openings codes for the Falkbeer Countergambit are C31 and C32.

Old Main line: 3...e4 
A typical line may run: 4.d3 Nf6 5.dxe4 Nxe4 6.Nf3 Bc5, where Black aims for the weakness on f2. In Maehrisch-Ostrau 1923, a game between Rudolf Spielmann and Siegbert Tarrasch continued: 7.Qe2 Bf5 (this was condemned by the Handbuch des Schachspiels because of White's next, though Black had already gotten into difficulties in the game Réti–Breyer, Budapest 1917, where 7...f5 8.Nfd2 Bf2+ 9.Kd1 Qxd5 10.Nc3 was played) 8.g4 (in retrospect, prudent was 8.Nc3) 8...0-0 9.gxf5 Re8 and Black has a tremendous position, as he is bound to regain material and White's positional deficiencies will remain.

This line fell out of favour after World War II, as Black encountered difficulties, with players eventually turning to the next idea.

Nimzovich Variation: 3...c6 
This has become the most commonly played move after 3.exd5, with its most notable advocate being John Nunn. It is usually attributed to Aron Nimzowitsch, who successfully played it in Spielmann–Nimzovich, Munich 1906. Frank Marshall actually introduced the move to master play, however, at Ostend 1905, defeating Richard Teichmann in 34 moves.  Annotating that game in his 1914 book Marshall's Chess "Swindles", Marshall described his 3...c6 as "An innovation."

Although Black won both of those games, 3...c6 languished in obscurity for many years thereafter. White can respond with 4.Qe2, despite the drastic defeat inflicted on the young Alexander Alekhine by Paul Johner at Carlsbad 1911, although 4.Nc3 exf4 is much more common. The resulting positions are analogous to the Modern Defence of the King's Gambit Accepted, in which White strives to utilise his 4–2  pawn , with Black relying on his piece activity and cramping pawn at f4 to play against White's king. Theory has not reached a definitive verdict, but the resulting positions are believed to offer Black more chances than 3...e4.

See also
 List of chess openings
 List of chess openings named after people

References

External links

Falkbeer Countergambit video and analysis
History of the Nimzovich variation and list of old magazine references to the Falkbeer

Chess openings

pl:Kontrgambit#Kontrgambit Falkbeera